The National Cyber Security Centre (NCSC) is an organisation of the United Kingdom Government that provides advice and support for the public and private sector in how to avoid computer security threats. Based in London, it became operational in October 2016, and its parent organisation is GCHQ.

History
The NCSC absorbed and replaced CESG (the information security arm of GCHQ), the Centre for Cyber Assessment (CCA), Computer Emergency Response Team UK (CERT UK) and the cyber-related responsibilities of the Centre for the Protection of National Infrastructure (CPNI). It built on earlier efforts of these organisations and the Cabinet Office to provide guidance on Information Assurance to the UK's wider private sector, such as the "10 Steps" guidance released in January 2015. In pre-launch announcements, the UK government stated that the NCSC would first work with the Bank of England to advise financial institutions on how to bolster online defences.

The centre was first announced in November 2015 by the Chancellor of the Exchequer, George Osborne. The existing Director General Cyber of GCHQ, Ciaran Martin, leads the new centre, and GCHQ's current Technical Director of Cyber Security, Dr Ian Levy, assumed the same role at the NCSC. A detailed paper on the creation of the NCSC, including a description of its structure and future challenges, written by the then Director of GCHQ, Robert Hannigan, who is widely credited with establishing the centre, was published by the Royal United Services Institute in February 2019.

The centre was dedicated by the Queen on 14 February 2017. Philip Hammond, the Chancellor of the Exchequer, announced an investment of £1.9 billion and an initiative to embed 100 people from industry into the NCSC on secondment.

In April 2016, the Ministry of Defence announced that a Cyber Security Operations Centre (CSOC) "to protect the MOD's cyberspace from malicious actors" with a budget of over £40 million will contribute to this initiative. It is located at MoD Corsham.

In October 2017, technical director Ian Levy was targeted by email prankster James Linton with a fake industry event; however, Levy correctly identified the unexpected headers and worked with him to put out a security blog about the incident.

On 1 October 2020 Lindy Cameron, formerly director-general of the Northern Ireland Office, took over from Ciaran Martin as CEO.

List of chief executives 

 Ciaran Martin (3 October 2016 to 31 August 2020)
 Lindy Cameron (1 October 2020 to present; was Acting CEO (1 September 2020 to 30 September 2020))

See also
 UK cyber security community
 National Cyber Security Centre (disambiguation) in other countries
 National Cyber Force

References

External links
 
 "New National Cyber Security Centre set to bring UK expertise together" – UK Government press release, March 2016
 "10 steps to cyber security" – NCSC, November 2018

2016 establishments in the United Kingdom
Cybercrime in the United Kingdom
Government agencies established in 2016
Government of the United Kingdom
Information technology organisations based in the United Kingdom
United Kingdom
National security of the United Kingdom
Organisations based in the City of Westminster